Percival Spencer Beale (14 September 19064 February 1981) was the 21st Chief Cashier of the Bank of England from 1 March 1949 to 16 January 1955. 

Beale was born on 14 September 1906 and entered Bank service on 27 October 1924. He was succeeded as Chief Cashier by Leslie O'Brien. 

Beale died on 4 February 1981.

References

1906 births
Chief Cashiers of the Bank of England
1981 deaths
20th-century English businesspeople